The ECW World Tag Team Championship was a professional wrestling world tag team championship in Extreme Championship Wrestling (ECW). It was introduced in National Wrestling Alliance (NWA) affiliate and ECW precursor, Eastern Championship Wrestling in 1992, but was established under ECW in 1994.

History 
The ECW World Tag Team Championship was introduced on June 23, 1992 under Eastern Championship Wrestling, the precursor to ECW as the Eastern Championship Wrestling Tag Team Championship. This was during the time Eastern Championship Wrestling was a member of the NWA. In September 1994, Eastern Championship Wrestling seceded from the NWA, and became Extreme Championship Wrestling. The title was then established as a world tag team championship and became known as the Extreme Championship Wrestling World Tag Team Championship. On January 3, 1997, wrestling legend Killer Kowalski presented ECW World Tag Team Champions The Eliminators with brand-new title belts in Webster, Massachusetts. The championship continued to be defended within the promotion until April 2001, when ECW closed down. ECW's assets were subsequently purchased by World Wrestling Entertainment (WWE). In 2006, WWE relaunched ECW as a WWE brand that remained active until 2010. However, the tag team championship was not reactivated.

Inaugural championship tournament

Reigns

References

External links 
 ECW World Tag Team Championship at www.wrestling-titles.com
 ECW World Tag Team Championship at WWE.com

Extreme Championship Wrestling championships
Tag team wrestling championships